The Evangelical Reformed Church of Christ is a Calvinist denomination in Nigeria, founded by the South African missionaries.

History 
The Evangelical Reformed Church of Christ was founded in 1916 by the Sudan Missionary Society- South Africa Branch. The first missionary establishment was in Plateau State, Nigeria. Later the church expanded to eastern provinces of Kwara State, Niger state, Southern Zaria, Southern Plateau State, Akwa Ibon State. In the course of its history the name of the church was modified, it was called the United Church of Christ in Central Nigeria. The South African missionaries were expelled in 1972-1973. The church has grown significantly in the last two decades. The Church has approximately 1,500 000 members in hundreds of congregations.

Doctrine

Creeds 
Apostle Creed
Nicene Creed
Athanasian Creed

Confessions 
Heidelberg Catechism
Canons of Dort
Westminster Confession of Faith
Second Helvetic Confession

References 

Reformed denominations in Africa
Members of the World Communion of Reformed Churches
Churches in Nigeria
1916 establishments in Nigeria